Timothy D. "Big Tim" Murphy (1885 – June 26, 1928) was a Chicago mobster and labor racketeer who controlled several major railroad, laundry and dye workers' unions during the 1910s and early 1920s.

Life 
Born in 1885, Murphy rose to prominence at the beginning of the 20th century in the bookmaking racket with then-partner Mont Tennes. In the 1910s, he established an Irish American gang which became one of Chicago's most powerful early organized crime organizations. Murphy's gang was one of the few respected by Al Capone and the Italian American-led Chicago Outfit.

A longtime rival of Maurice "Mossy" Enright, Murphy was suspected in his February 1920 gangland slaying. Murphy was released due to lack of evidence.

Murphy was involved in a wide array of crimes and arrested and/or indicted numerous times. In February 1921, Murphy was charged with involvement in organizing the theft of $400,000 from a Pullman mail train at Chicago's Union Station in August 1920. Although he was released on a $30,000 bond, Murphy was eventually convicted and sentenced by Judge Kenesaw Mountain Landis to seven years imprisonment.

On May 6, 1922, Murphy, Cornelius Shea, and six other labor leaders were arrested and charged with the murder of a Chicago police officer. On May 24, the state asked for nolle prosequi and the court agreed to withdraw the indictments.  A new indictment was returned against Murphy and the others in August, but this second indictment was withdrawn by the state as well.

Death 
"Big Tim" Murphy was shot and killed as he answered the front door of his home on the night of June 26, 1928. His murder was never solved, but he may have been gunned down by former associates of Enright's. Others suggest he was killed by Murray "The Camel" Humphreys, a former hitman and later a lieutenant for the Chicago Outfit.

Murphy's widow, Margaret (called by the nickname "Flo"), later married mobster John "Dingbat" O'Berta, a Murphy protégé.

References

Further reading
Moore, William T. "Big Tim Murphy." Plain Talk. 1927.
Seidman, Harold. Labor Czars: A History of Labor Racketeering. New York: Liveright Publishing Corporation, 1938.

1928 deaths
American gangsters
Gangsters from Chicago
Murdered American gangsters of Irish descent
People murdered in Illinois
Male murder victims
Deaths by firearm in Illinois
1885 births